Pampamarca District may refer to:

Peru
Pampamarca District, Canas
Pampamarca District, La Unión
Pampamarca District, Yarowilca